Sir Kenneth Smith Mackenzie, 6th Baronet (25 May 1832 - 9 February 1900) was a British diplomat, landowner and Lord Lieutenant of Ross and Cromarty 1881-1899.

Biography
Mackenzie was the son of Sir Francis Mackenzie, 5th Baronet, and a descendant of the Lords Mackenzie of Kintail. He succeeded his father in 1843, and became 6th baronet and the 13th feudal baron of Gairloch. He was the hereditary owner of 170,000 acres of land in Ross-shire.

He entered the diplomatic service, and was appointed an attaché at Washington in 1854.

He was appointed Lord Lieutenant of Ross-shire in 1881, and continued when that office was replaced by the Lord Lieutenant of Ross and Cromarty in 1891 through the operation of the Local Government (Scotland) Act 1889. He served on the Napier Commission on the Condition of the Crofters and Cottars in the Highlands and Islands of Scotland in 1883 and 1884.  He was chairman of the Ross-shire County Council from 1889. He was also a promoter of the Loch Maree and Aultbea Railway.

Mackenzie died at his residence Conan House, Ross-shire on 9 February 1900.

Family
Mackenzie married, in 1860, Eila Frederica Campbell, daughter of Walter Frederick Campbell, of Islay. Their son Kenneth Mackenzie succeeded to the baronetcy.

References

1832 births
1900 deaths
British diplomats
British landowners
Baronets in the Baronetage of Nova Scotia
19th-century British businesspeople